Lake Pleasant Town Hall is a historic town hall located at Speculator in Lake Pleasant, Hamilton County, New York.  It was built in 1894 and is a simple -story, three-by-three-bay, front-gabled, clapboard-sided building.  It was used as town hall and library until 1961, when the town offices moved to new quarters.  The library remained until 2003 and it is now used as a local history museum.

It was added to the National Register of Historic Places in 2009.

References

External links
The Museum and Historical Society of Lake Pleasant & Speculator

History museums in New York (state)
Museums in Hamilton County, New York
City and town halls on the National Register of Historic Places in New York (state)
Historical society museums in New York (state)
Buildings and structures in Hamilton County, New York
National Register of Historic Places in Hamilton County, New York